Callibryastis is a genus of moths belonging to the subfamily Tortricinae of the family Tortricidae. It contains only one species, Callibryastis pachnota, which is found in Vietnam and India.

Adults usually have almost unicolorous blackish brown forewings.

See also
List of Tortricidae genera

References

External links
tortricidae.com

Archipini
Monotypic moth genera
Taxa named by Edward Meyrick
Moths of Asia
Tortricidae genera